Central Hindu School, formerly known as Central Hindu College, is one of India's largest schools which is situated at Kamachha in the heart of the holy city Varanasi.It is affiliated to Central Board of Secondary Education and is governed by Banaras Hindu University (1976) and Senior High School (11th standard) was called Pre University Course.

History
Founded by noted freedom-fighter Annie Besant in July 1898, with Dr. Arthur Richardson, a science graduate from England as the principal., Later Annie Besant dedicated this school to Pt. Madan Mohan Malviya, Administration of this school is now a responsibility of Banaras Hindu University and the Institution went on to become the nucleus of Banaras Hindu University, which was established in 1916. Asia's first Educational conference was held in the ground of the CHBS. Ruler of the Indian Princely State of Benares State (Royal House of Benares) Prabhu Narayan Singh was instrumental in setting up the school and donated requisite land for the school.

This school had run under graduation classes as a loaner for Banaras Hindu University which was founded by Pandit Madan Mohan Malaviya and was still under construction. The charge of the Central Hindu College was handed over to the Hindu University Society on 27 November 1915. By a notification issued by the Government, in October 1917, the Central Hindu College became a constituent college of the newly formed university. The Sayaji Rao Gaekwad Library (Central Library), BHU was first housed in the Telang Library of the College in 1917.

Theosophist George Arundale joined the school as a history teacher in 1917, and later became the head of the school. It is one of the oldest school in Varanasi. CHBS has the longest playground in all over the Purvanchal where a football tournament is played by many colleges of Varanasi. CHBS has a Sarga Hall which is one of the longest halls. There is a historical library which was established in 1912 and known as Kashinath Traimbak Telang Library. The Sayaji Rao Gaekwad Library was first housed in the Telang Library of the College in 1917. The library houses more than 30,000 valuable books such as encyclopedias, novels, old books on different subjects besides numerous magazines, newspapers, and digests. To create special awareness in mathematics and science the school has been organizing Ramanujan Memorial Mathematics Contest and Sir C.V. Raman Science Quiz since 1988.

Campus
Central Hindu Boys School's campus spreads over 70 acres and houses the school, hostel, laboratories (physics, chemistry, biology, mathematics, computer, psychology and agriculture), gym and library. The school has more than 50 classrooms and houses several halls. A football field, cricket field, basketball court and tennis courts are amongst the sporting facilities available. Annual inter-school football competition, which is held at the school grounds, is one of the major sport events of the school.

Cultural programs
There is also held cultural programs at biggest level such as Krishna Janmastami, Anniversary of Annie Besant(1, October) etc.
The annual day is also celebrated.

Reservation
As per the BHU EC resolution dated 29/30 March 1996, the following reservations will be given for admissions in the seats available  for admission in various classes after giving seats to internal students:
 15% seats are reserved for Schedule Caste candidates.
 7.5% seats are reserved for Schedule Tribe candidates.
 27% seats are reseverd for Other Backward class candidates. 
 5% seats are reserved for physically challenged physically challenged candidates, as per disability act 32(1) 2016 
 50% seats available for admission shall be provided to the sons and daughters of permanent employees of BHU, subject to securing a minimum of 33% marks in Entrance Test.

Publications

Noted alumni

 K. N. Govindacharya: social and political activist
 Kamalapati Tripathi: writer, journalist, editor, freedom-fighter, Politician, Chief Minister of Uttar Pradesh and Union Minister for Railways.
 Kaushalendra Singh: Mayor of Varanasi
 Sri Prakasa: politician, freedom-fighter, governor & administrator. India's first High Commissioner to Pakistan.

References

 Brief History of Central Hindu College, Banaras Hindu University Dr. Rajendra Prasad, Correspondence and Select Documents, by Rajendra Prasad, Valmiki Choudhary. Allied Publishers, 1984. . Page 479, http://www.bhu.ac.in/school/index.html.

External links
 Admission opens at Central Hindu School Varanasi.
 Central Hindu College, Varanasi

High schools and secondary schools in Uttar Pradesh
Schools in Varanasi
Banaras Hindu University
Educational institutions established in 1898
1898 establishments in India